KDAO (1190 AM) is a commercial radio station serving the Marshalltown, Iowa area.  The station broadcasts an oldies format.  KDAO is licensed to MTN Broadcasting, Inc.

Previous logo

External links
KDAO website

DAO
Marshalltown, Iowa